Elaine J Lawless (born 1947) is an American folklorist.  She is Curators' Professor Emerita of English and Folklore Studies at the University of Missouri. In 2008 she was elected president of the American Folklore Society.

Education 
Lawless gained a Ph.D. from Indiana University in 1982. Her thesis title was 'Women's speech in the Pentecostal religious service: an ethnography' .

Career 
Lawless is the author of 10 academic books and numerous articles.

Lawless's research has been in the fields of folklore studies, women's and gender studies, and religious studies.  Her work has included studies of Pentecostalism; work on women's literature and women's narratives; human rights, social justice and violence against women.

She has also co-produced two documentary films: Joy Unspeakable (with Elizabeth Peterson) and Taking Pinhook (2014) (with Todd Lawrence).

In 2003, she founded and was the producer of the Troubling Violence Performance Project, with Professor Heather Carver of the University of Missouri Theatre Department.

Recognition 
Between 2000 and 2005 Lawless was editor of the Journal of American Folklore. Lawless served as President of the American Folklore Society (AFS) from 2008 to 2009.  

In 2019, Lawless and Tim Lawrence received the AFS's Chicago Folklore Prize (for the best book of folklore scholarship of the year), for their book: When They Blew the Levee: Race, Politics, and Community in Pinhook, Missouri.

A travel award from the Folk Belief and Religious Folklife Section of the AFS is named in Lawless's honour.

Selected publications

Articles and chapters 
 Lawless, Elaine J. (1985). "Oral "Character" and "Literary" Art: A Call for a New Reciprocity between Oral Literature and Folklore". Western Folklore. 44 (2): 77–96. . .
 Lawless, Elaine J. (1987). "Piety and Motherhood: Reproductive Images and Maternal Strategies of the Woman Preacher". The Journal of American Folklore. 100 (398): 469–478. . .
 Lawless, Elaine J. (1988). ""The Night I Got the Holy Ghost...": Holy Ghost Narratives and the Pentecostal Conversion Process". Western Folklore. 47 (1): 1–19. . .
 Lawless, Elaine J. (1992). ""I Was Afraid Someone like You... an Outsider... Would Misunderstand": Negotiating Interpretive Differences between Ethnographers and Subjects". The Journal of American Folklore. 105 (417): 302–314. . .
 Lawless, Elaine J. (1998). "Claiming Inversion: Lesbian Constructions of Female Identity as Claims for Authority". The Journal of American Folklore. 111 (439): 3–22. . .
 Lawless, Elaine J. (2000). ""Reciprocal" Ethnography: No One Said It Was Easy". Journal of Folklore Research. 37 (2/3): 197–205. .
 Lawless, Elaine J. (2003). "Woman as Abject: "Resisting Cultural and Religious Myths That Condone Violence against Women"". Western Folklore. 62 (4): 237–269. .
 Lawless, Elaine J. (2008). "Place, Space, and Disruption: A Response to the Question "Why Doesn't She Just Leave?". Western Folklore. 67 (1): 35–58. .
 Lawless, Elaine J. (2008), "In Search of Our Mothers . . . and Our Selves", in de Caro, Frank (ed.), The Folklore Muse, Poetry, Fiction, and Other Reflections by Folklorists, University Press of Colorado, pp. 39–53, retrieved 2022-02-20
 Lawless, Elaine J. (2008), "Ecstacy Across a Thin Line: Pentecostalism in the Deep South," in Callahan, Richard (ed.), New Territories, New Perspectives: The Religious Impact of the Louisiana Purchase Univ. of Missouri Press, 2008

Books 
 Lawless, Elaine J. (1988). Handmaidens of the Lord : Pentecostal women preachers and traditional religion. Philadelphia: University of Pennsylvania Press. . .
 Lawless, Elaine J (1993). Fiddling in Missouri. Columbia, Mo.: Missouri Folklore Society. .
 Lawless, Elaine J (1993). Holy women, wholly women: sharing ministries of wholeness through life stories and reciprocal ethnography. Philadelphia: University of Pennsylvania Press. . .
 Lawless, Elaine J; NetLibrary, Inc (1996). Women preaching revolution calling for connection in a disconnected time. Philadelphia, Pa.: University of Pennsylvania Press. . .
 Lawless, Elaine J. (2001). Women escaping violence : empowerment through narrative. Columbia: University of Missouri Press. . .
 Lawless, Elaine J. and Carver, Heather M. (2010). Troubling violence : a performance project. Jackson: Univ Pr Of Mississippi. . .
 Lawless, Elaine J (2015). God's Peculiar People. The University Press of Kentucky. . .
 Lawless, Elaine J.  (2017). The liberation of Winifred Bryan Horner : writer, teacher, and women's rights advocate. Bloomington, Indiana. . .
 Lawless, Elaine J. and Lawrence, David Todd (2018). When they blew the levee : politics, race, and community in Pinhook, Missouri. Jackson. . .
 Lawless, Elaine J. (2019). Reciprocal ethnography and the power of women's narratives. Amy Shuman. Bloomington, Indiana. . .

External Links 

 "Folklore as a Map of the World" Elaine J Lawless delivering the 2009 Presidential Address at the Annual Meeting of the American Folklore Society in Boise, Idaho
 "What Zora Knew: A Crossroads, a Bargain with the Devil, and a Late Witness" Elaine J Lawless delivering the 2010 Don Yoder Lecture at the Annual Meeting of the American Folklore Society in Nashville, Tennessee

References 

1947 births
American folklorists
Women folklorists
Presidents of the American Folklore Society
Living people
University of Missouri faculty